Laura Nolan (born 31 May 1994) is an Irish ballroom dancer and choreographer.

Early life 
Nolan was born in Lucan in Dublin. She is trained in ballroom, latin and ballet dancing.

Professional career 
Nolan first began dancing competitively at the age of five when she competed in the All Ireland Championships in June 1999 with her first partner, Luca Mastropietro. The couple reached the quarterfinals of their first championship.

From 2009 to 2013, Nolan danced with English dancer, Stanislav Wakeham.

From 2015 to 2019, Nolan danced with Italian dancer, Alessandro Bosco. In 2018 they finished in first place in the World Open Adult Standard at the Bacau Dance Open tournament.

Nolan was a finalist in the Under 21 World Championship, placing amongst the top ten in the world. In 2018, she and Bosco ranked fifth in the World Open. Nolan has won numerous International Open championships and was a finalist in the German Open. Making her the first Irish dancer to compete in the World Championships.

In 2019, the couple announced their retirement from ballroom dancing.

Media career 
In 2020, Nolan was crowned Miss Universe Leinster. She went on to take part in the Miss Universe Ireland competition where she reached the top three.

In 2021, Nolan appeared as a contestant in the celebrity version of the RTÉ programme, Hell Week.

Dancing with the Stars 
In November 2019, it was confirmed that Nolan would be joining the cast of the Irish series of Dancing with the Stars as a professional dancer. She was paired with television presenter and Big Brother winner, Brian Dowling. They were eliminated in the seventh week of the competition.

In 2022, Nolan partnered former Love Island contestant, Matthew MacNabb. Despite receiving some of the lowest scores from the judges throughout their time on the show, Nolan and MacNabb reached the semi-final of the competition, finishing in fifth place.

In 2023, Nolan partnered comedian, Kevin McGahern. Nolan once again reached the semi-final of the competition with McGahern and finished in fifth place, following their dance-off against Suzanne Jackson and Michael Danilczuk.

Highest and Lowest Scoring Per Dance

1 This score was awarded during Switch-Up Week.

Performances with Brian Dowling

Performances with Matthew MacNabb

Performances with Kevin McGahern

Personal life 
In March 2022, Nolan confirmed that she was in a relationship with her Series 5 celebrity partner, Matthew MacNabb, following their elimination from the show.

References 

1994 births
Living people
Ballroom dancers